The Revolutionist Workers' Party (DİP) is a Trotskyist and internationalist socialist political party in Turkey. DİP is a section of the Co-ordinating Committee for the Refoundation of the Fourth International.

In February 2014 the DIP conducted the political defence of one of its comrades in Antalya.

It held its conference in mid-2014 with delegates from other CRFI organisations.

References

External links
DIP People's Program for Overcoming the Crisis (English)

2007 establishments in Turkey
Communist parties in Turkey
Coordinating Committee for the Refoundation of the Fourth International
Far-left politics in Turkey
Political parties established in 2007
Trotskyist organizations in Turkey